Wild Bill Hickok Memorial is a state historic site operated by the Illinois Historic Preservation Agency. It is located in a small park at the intersection of Main and Ottawa Streets in Troy Grove, Illinois. The memorial marks the site of the birthplace of “Wild Bill” Hickok and features a plaque on the granite monument that honors Hickok's services as a scout and spy in the western states during the American Civil War, and as a frontier express messenger. The monument was dedicated on August 29, 1930.

References

External links
Wild Bill Hickok Memorial

Illinois State Historic Sites
Monuments and memorials in Illinois
Protected areas of LaSalle County, Illinois
Protected areas established in 1930
Outdoor sculptures in Illinois
1999 sculptures
Bronze sculptures in Illinois
1930 establishments in Illinois